Hello, Dolly! is a 1964 (see 1964 in music) studio album by the American jazz singer Ella Fitzgerald.

"Hello, Dolly!," "People," "Can't Buy Me Love," and "The Sweetest Sounds" were recorded in London, England, on April 7.  The other eight tracks were recorded in New York City on March 3 and March 4.  Three songs recorded at the latter sessions remain unreleased: "There! I've Said It Again," "I'll See You in My Dreams," and "There Are Such Things."  It is unknown whether the recordings exist in the Verve Records vaults today.

Her version of the Beatles song "Can't Buy Me Love" was a minor hit single in 1964, peaking at #34 in the UK singles chart.

Track listing
For the 1964 Verve LP release; Verve V6-4064; Re-issued in 2005 on CD, Verve B0004675-02

Personnel
Recorded March 3-March 4, 1964, New York City:

Tracks 5-12

 Ella Fitzgerald - Vocals
 Frank DeVol - Arranger, Conductor
 Zoot Sims - Tenor saxophone
 Hank Jones - Piano on track 8
 Others unknown

Recorded April 7, 1964, London:

Tracks 1-4

 Ella Fitzgerald - Vocals
 Johnnie Spence - Conductor
 Henri René - Arranger on track 1
 Others unknown

References

1964 albums
Ella Fitzgerald albums
Verve Records albums
Albums produced by Norman Granz
Albums conducted by Frank De Vol
Albums arranged by Henri René
Albums arranged by Frank De Vol
Covers albums